Honolulu Lu is a 1941 American musical film directed by Charles Barton and written by Eliot Gibbons. The film stars Lupe Vélez, Bruce Bennett, Leo Carrillo, Marjorie Gateson, Don Beddoe and Forrest Tucker. The film was released December 11, 1941, by Columbia Pictures.

Plot

In Hawaii, Consuelo Cordoba (Lupe Vélez) is a risque nightclub act and due to her involvement with a group of sailors becomes a beauty queen.

Cast
 Lupe Vélez as Consuelo Cordoba
 Bruce Bennett as Skelly
 Leo Carrillo as Don Estaban Cordoba
 Marjorie Gateson as Mrs. Van Derholt
 Don Beddoe as Bennie Blanchard
 Forrest Tucker as Barney
 George McKay as Horseface
 Nina Campana as Aloha
 Roger Clark as Bill Van Derhoolt
 Helen Dickson as Mrs. Smythe
 Curtis Railing as Mrs. Frobisher

References

External links 
 
 
 
 

1941 films
American black-and-white films
1940s English-language films
World War II films made in wartime
American World War II films
1941 romantic comedy films
1940s romantic musical films
American musical comedy films
American romantic comedy films
American romantic musical films
Columbia Pictures films
Films directed by Charles Barton
Films set in Hawaii